The iota subscript is a diacritic mark in the Greek alphabet shaped like a small vertical stroke or miniature iota  placed below the letter. It can occur with the vowel letters eta , omega , and alpha . It represents the former presence of an  offglide after the vowel, forming a so‐called "long diphthong". Such diphthongs (i.e.)—phonologically distinct from the corresponding normal or "short" diphthongs (i.e.,  )—were a feature of ancient Greek in the pre-classical and classical eras.

The offglide was gradually lost in pronunciation, a process that started already during the classical period and continued during the Hellenistic period, with the result that, from approximately the 1st century BC onwards, the former long diphthongs were no longer distinguished in pronunciation from the simple long vowels (long monophthongs)  respectively. 

During the Roman and Byzantine eras, the iota, now mute, was sometimes still written as a normal letter but was often simply left out. The iota subscript was invented by Byzantine philologists in the 12th century AD as an editorial symbol marking the places where such spelling variation occurred.

The alternative practice, of writing the mute iota not under, but next to the preceding vowel, is known as iota adscript. In mixed-case environments, it is represented either as a slightly reduced iota (smaller than regular lowercase iota), or as a full-sized lowercase iota. In the latter case, it can be recognized as iota adscript by the fact that it never carries any diacritics (breathing marks, accents). 

In uppercase-only environments, it is represented again either as slightly reduced iota (smaller than regular lowercase iota), or as a full-sized uppercase Iota. In digital environments, and for linguistic reasons also in all other environments, the representation as a slightly reduced iota is recommended. There are Unicode codepoints for all Greek vowels with iota adscript (for example), allowing for easy implementation of that recommendation in digital environments.

Terminology

In Greek, the subscript is called , the perfect passive participle form of the verb , "to write below". Analogously, the adscript is called , from the verb , "to write next (to something), to add in writing".

The Greek names are grammatically feminine participle forms because in medieval Greek the name of the letter iota, to which they implicitly refer, was sometimes construed as a feminine noun (unlike in classical and in modern Greek, where it is neuter). The Greek terms, transliterated according to their modern pronunciation as ypogegrammeni and prosgegrammeni respectively, were also chosen for use in character names in the computer encoding standard Unicode.

They existed in the Greek language up into the classical period. From the classical period onwards, they changed to simple vowels (monophthongs), but sometimes continued to be written as diphthongs. In the medieval period, these spellings were replaced by spellings with an iota subscript, to mark former diphthongs which were no longer pronounced. In some English works these are referred to as "improper diphthongs".

Usage

The iota subscript occurs most frequently in certain inflectional affixes of ancient Greek, especially in the dative endings of many nominal forms (e.g. ) as well as in certain verb forms of the subjunctive mood (e.g. ).

The iota subscript is today considered an obligatory feature in the spelling of ancient Greek, but its usage is subject to some variation. In some modern editions of classical texts, the original pronunciation of long diphthongs is represented by the use of iota adscript, with accents and breathing marks placed on the first vowel. The same is generally true for works dealing with epigraphy, paleography or other philological contexts where adherence to original historical spellings and linguistic correctness is considered important.

Different conventions exist for the treatment of subscript/adscript iota with uppercase letters. In Western printing, the most common practice is to use subscript diacritics only in lowercase environments and to use an adscript (i.e. a normal full-sized iota glyph) instead whenever the host letter is capitalized. When this happens in a mixed-case spelling environment (i.e. with only the first letter of a word capitalized, as in proper names and at the beginning of a sentence), then the adscript iota regularly takes the shape of the normal lowercase iota letter (e.g.  → ). In an all-capitals environment, the adscript is also regularly capitalized. In Greece, a more common convention is to print subscript diacritics both with lowercase and uppercase letters alike. Yet another, intermediate convention is to use lowercase adscript iotas both for mixed-case and for all-capitals words (e.g. ), or to use a special glyph in the shape of a smaller capital iota in the latter case.

In modern Greek, subscript iota was generally retained in use in the spelling of the archaizing Katharevousa. It can also be found regularly in older printed Demotic in the 19th and early 20th century, but it is often absent from the modern spelling of present-day standard Greek. Even when present-day Greek is spelled in the traditional polytonic system, the number of instances where a subscript could be written is much smaller than in older forms of the language, because most of its typical grammatical environments no longer occur: the old dative case is not used in modern Greek except in a few fossilized phrases (e.g. In the monotonic standard orthography, subscript iota is not used.

Transliteration
In transliteration of Greek into the Latin alphabet, the iota subscript is often omitted. The Chicago Manual of Style, however, recommends the iota subscript be "transliterated by an i on the line, following the vowel it is associated with (ἀνθρώπῳ, anthrṓpōi)." (11.131 in the 16th edition, 10.131 in the 15th.)

Computer encoding

In the Unicode standard, iota subscript is represented by a non-spacing combining diacritic character U+0345 "Combining Greek Ypogegrammeni". In addition, for capitalized ("titlecase") use, Unicode provides a corresponding set of 27 precomposed code points with "prosgegrammeni" ( → ). Despite their name, which implies the use of an adscript glyph, these code points are defined as being equivalent to a combination of the base letter and the combining subscript character U+0345, just like their lowercase equivalents. They may be variously realized with either a subscript diacritic or a full-sized adscript iota glyph, depending on the font design. For use in all-capitals ("uppercase"), Unicode additionally stipulates a special case-mapping rule according to which lowercase letters should be mapped to combinations of the uppercase letter and uppercase iota ( → ). This rule not only replaces the representation of a monophthong with that of a diphthong, but it also destroys the reversibility of any capitalization process in digital environments, as the combination of uppercase letter and uppercase iota would normally be converted back to lowercase letter and lowercase iota. It is therefore strongly recommended, both for the integrity of text and for the practical compatibility with digital environments, that lowercase letter and iota subscript should be capitalized in all situations and contexts as uppercase letter and iota adscript. A future revision of the above-mentioned Unicode stipulation is linguistically stipulated and digitally inevitable, as its application is both destructive to the text and impractical in digital applications.

In the ASCII-based encoding standard Beta Code, the iota subscript is represented by the pipe character "|" placed after the letter.

See also
Greek diacritics
Hypodiastole

References

Greek-script diacritics
Greek letters
Koine Greek